Fotunu'upule Auelua (known as Fotu) is an Australian rugby union player who plays at Number 8 for the Brumbies in Super Rugby. He previously played for Dax, Toulon and NTT Communications Shining Arcs.

Early life

Auelua is of Samoan descent. He was born in Wellington but moved with his family to Campbelltown in Sydney at a young age, where he played most of his junior rugby for the Campbelltown Harlequins Rugby Club. He attended Trinity Grammar and played rugby for the Australian Schoolboys in 2001 and 2002.

Career 
Auelua played for West Harbour between 2003 and 2005.

In March 2010 he signed a two-year deal to join the Brumbies in 2012, with the Australian Rugby Union to pay part of his salary. In the interim, he rejoined his former West Harbour  coach and mentor Joe Barakat at Tokyo-based NTT Communications club side from July 2011 to February 2012.

Auelua was named as captain of the Canberra Vikings for the inaugural season of Australia's National Rugby Championship in 2014.

Club 
 Until 2003 : Campbelltown Harlequins 
 2003–2005 : West Harbour  
 2006–2007 : US Dax 
 2007–2010 : RC Toulon

Honours 
 Pro D2 Champions : 2008
 Winner of the Pro D2 finals: 2007

Super Rugby statistics

References

External links 
  Player profile at lequipe.fr
  Statistics at itsrugby.fr
 Brumbies profile

1984 births
Australian rugby union players
Australian sportspeople of Samoan descent
ACT Brumbies players
Canberra Vikings players
US Dax players
RC Toulonnais players
Urayasu D-Rocks players
Yokohama Canon Eagles players
Rugby union number eights
Rugby union players from Wellington City
New Zealand emigrants to Australia
Australian expatriate rugby union players
Expatriate rugby union players in France
Australian expatriate sportspeople in France
Living people
Expatriate rugby union players in Japan
Australian expatriate sportspeople in Japan